Flying Chalks is a Singapore-based company that specializes in helping students study abroad.

Flying Chalks operates an AI-powered platform that is complemented by the provision of study abroad services, ranging from consultations and school applications, to VISA assistance and accommodation placement.

The platform provides customized recommendations based on the student profile as well as information on study abroad destinations and schools. There are school guides with country- and school-specific information curated by the Flying Chalks team, along with user-generated content such as school reviews and tips for international students. When students have decided on their study abroad destination, school and program, they can proceed to apply for it through Flying Chalks.

History 
Flying Chalks was founded by Melvin Lee, a graduate from Singapore Management University, in May 2015. The company was awarded incubation at the Singapore Management University's Institute of Innovation and Entrepreneurship in November 2015.

Flying Chalks launched their Minimum Viable Product in January 2016. They went on establish partnerships with student clubs, universities and embassies, as well as developed their platform by including more content and introducing new features. Within 6 months from the official launch, Flying Chalks’ community grew to 2,000 students from more than 50 universities worldwide.

In March 2016, Flying Chalks received a Pre-Seed investment from venture capital firm, Expara.

Growth 

Flying Chalks expanded into its first overseas market, South Korea, in November 2016. Building on its popularity, it subsequently expanded into Vietnam in 2017, and Indonesia in 2018. To date, it has offices in Singapore, Busan (South Korea), Hanoi (Vietnam), Ho Chi Minh City (Vietnam) and Surabaya (Indonesia); a total of 5 offices in 4 countries.

The Flying Chalks student community has also grown to 13,000 students from over 600 schools worldwide.

Achievements 
Flying Chalks was one of 78 start-ups to be invited to Korea for the K-Startup Grand Challenge 2016 by the Korean government. A total of 2,439 companies across 124 countries applied.

They emerged first runner-up and received $15,000 in cash funding at the P.A.K. Entrepreneurs’ Challenge 2016, a competition that seeks to identify and support teams with the most executable and validated business ideas.

Melvin, the Founder & CEO of Flying Chalks, was awarded the "Youth Entrepreneur Award" at Promising SME 500 in 2016 for his founding role in Flying Chalks. The award was presented by Singapore's Member of Parliament (MP), Mr. Sitoh Yih Pin.

In December 2018, Flying Chalks received the "Golden Bull Award 2018" in the "Emerging SMEs" category for its outstanding growth and overall excellence.

In March 2019, Flying Chalks was featured on a TV Program by SBS - one of South Korea's three national broadcasters.

References 

Education companies of Singapore
Educational technology companies of Singapore